Acupalpus flavicollis is a species of ground beetle in the family Carabidae.

Description

General morphology
Acupalpus flavicollis is between 2,9 mm and 3,7 mm long.

Distribution
This palaearctic species is present in many countries and from west to East ranges from the United Kingdom to Easter Russia. From Sweden and North European Russia in the North to Italy, Greece and even the Azores Islands in the South.

Ecology
In western Europe, the species seems to only be found in restored areas.

Habitat
A. flavicollis is found in swamps, marshes and near river banks.

References

flavicollis
Beetles described in 1825